Dmytro Nevmyvaka (born 19 March 1984) is a Ukrainian former professional football player. He started his career for FC Metalurh Zaporizhzhia in 2003.

External links

1984 births
Living people
Ukrainian footballers
Ukraine under-21 international footballers
Ukrainian Premier League players
Association football defenders
Expatriate footballers in Belarus
Ukrainian expatriate footballers
FC Metalurh-2 Zaporizhzhia players
FC Metalurh Zaporizhzhia players
FC Mariupol players
FC Gomel players
FC Granit Mikashevichi players
Footballers from Zaporizhzhia